UniMás is an American Spanish language broadcast television television network owned by TelevisaUnivision USA, which was launched on January 14, 2002 as TeleFutura. , the network currently has 26 owned-and-operated stations, and current affiliation agreements with 19 other television stations. UniMás maintains a national cable network feed that is distributed directly to cable, satellite and IPTV providers in various media markets not listed in this article, as an alternative method of distribution in areas without either the availability or the demand for a locally based owned-and-operated or affiliate station.

This article is a listing of current UniMás affiliates in the continental United States and U.S. possessions (including subchannel affiliates, satellite stations and select low-power translators), with outlets owned by network parent company TelevisaUnivision USA separated from privately owned affiliates. All stations listed are arranged alphabetically by state, and based on the station's city of license and followed in parentheses by the Designated Market Area if it differs from the city of license. There are links to and articles on each of the broadcast stations and international channels, describing their histories, local programming and technical information, such as broadcast frequencies.

The station's virtual (PSIP) channel number follows the call letters. The table listing the network's owned-and-operated outlets displays the station's actual digital channel number in parentheses following the PSIP number; the digital channel number is listed as a separate column in the list of private affiliates.

Owned-and-operated stations

(++) – Indicates a station that was owned by USA Broadcasting prior to its acquisition by TelevisaUnivision USA in 2001.

UniMás-affiliated stations

Current affiliates

Former affiliates

Notes and references

Station notes

References

Unimas